Dumat al-Jandal, also known as Al-Jawf or Al-Jouf, is an ancient city of ruins and the historical capital of the Al Jawf Province, northwestern Saudi Arabia. It is located 37 km away from Sakakah. The name Dumat al-Jandal means literally "Dumah of the Stone"; the name Al-Jawf means "depression", referring to Wadi Sirhan. The city's ancient Akkadian name was Adummatu. Dumat al-Jandal has a boundary wall which is considered a historical site. Moreover, there is an oasis that has a number of ruins.

The ancient city of Duma have been described as "the stronghold of the Arabians" by a Neo-Assyrian clay prism dating from the 7th century BC.

Some scholars identify this site as territory of Dumah, one of the twelve sons of Ishmael mentioned in  the Book of Genesis. There is no archaeological evidence that the Biblical patriarchs existed, and most scholars do not believe Genesis is an accurate historical record.

Pre-Islamic history 
The city has a history dating back to the  10th century BC and is mentioned in Akkadian inscriptions of the Assyrian empire dating to 845 BC in which it is referred to as Adummatu and is described as the capital of an Arab kingdom, sometimes named as Qedar (Qidri). The names of five powerful Arab queens that ruled this city are known, among them Zabibe, Samsi, Tabua and Te'elhunu. The latter is also given the title of high priestess of Atarsamain, a deity of fertility, love and war associated with Ishtar. Dumat al-Jundal was the site of an important temple dedicated to Ishtar. Sacrifices of animals were common and Porphyry’s De Abstenentia reports that, in Dumat Al-Jandal, a boy was sacrificed annually and was buried underneath an altar. Some scholars have extrapolated this practice to the rest of the Nabataeans.

Excavations made by Khaleel Ibrahim al-Muaikel in 1986 added to observations made in 1976 that a homogenous layer of Roman-Nabataean pottery sherds indicating a prosperous community during the time of the Nabataeans to whose realm this part of the region probably belonged.

This town is perhaps intended in a passage from Isaiah:

In 106 AD, Dumatha was incorporated into the Roman Empire when the Emperor Trajan defeated the Nabataeans. Dumatha remained integral to the Limes Arabicus for over four centuries, serving as the easternmost settlement along the limes. In 269 AD, the place was mentioned by Zenobia, the Queen of Palmyra, as city with an immune fortress. After her forces had captured the city, the fortress of Marid withstood the attack in her revolt against the Romans. Later in the 5th century AD, the city became the capital of the kingdom of Kinda.

The ancient oasis town was among a number of cities that the Pre Islamic Arabs would travel to as part of the sequence of market fairs held annually. In contrast to the other market cities, Duma was characterized by its disputed political sovereignty between Arab clients of the Byzantines and Sasanids that made claims to it. The markets of Duma specialized in slavery and prostitution with the Banu Kalb, the dominant tribal group in the area, being known to practice slavery more than other tribes.

During Muhammad's era

The city had been the object of no fewer than three raids due to its strategic location. It lay about fifteen days march north from Medina and about half that distance from Damascus.

Muhammad ordered the Invasion of Dumatul Jandal in July 626. Muhammad had received intelligence that some tribes there were involved in highway robbery and preparing to attack Medina itself. No casualties were reported as Ghatafan tribe fled

He also ordered the Expedition of Khalid ibn al-Walid (Dumatul Jandal), which took place in October 630 to attack the Christian prince of Duma, as well as the Expedition of Khalid ibn al-Walid (2nd Dumatul Jandal) in April 631 to demolish an idol called Wadd, worshipped by the Banu Kalb tribe. In 630 AD, Khalid ibn al-Walid captured Dumat Al-Jandal and it became a part of the newly formed Islamic empire.

Umar Mosque 
Umar Mosque (wrongly attributed to Umar Ibn Al-Khattab) is situated in Dumat Al-Jandal, a major intersection of ancient trade routes linking Mesopotamia, Syria with Arabia. The Mosque was built in 634-644. However, the actual construction appears to have been a much earlier period as a Church. Some scholars attribute it to the Umayyad Caliph Umar bin Abul Aziz, and some believe that the mosque was named after Bani Umar, a tribe that settled in Dumat Al-Jandal.

The north (qibla) wall of the mosque faces the Marid Fort across a street. On its other three sides, it is surrounded by dense urban fabric. Like any other old town mosque, the stone construction composes of a courtyard preceding the main prayer hall to the south and another space, also used for prayer, to the north. The minaret is at the southwestern corner of the prayer hall bridging over a street. The mosque is entered through a door situated in the qibla wall, near the minaret. The prayer hall is formed by three rows of stone pillars, running parallel to the qibla wall. The pillars are all by wooden lintels, which in turn support layers of stone that are roofed by mud-plastered acacia and palm trunks.

The mihrab is a narrow, corbelled niche in the center of the qibla wall, and is defined by a similar niche with three built-in stone steps to its right. The mihrab, the minbar, and the lower part of the qibla wall are plastered with white wash. Viewed from the outside, one sees that the mihrab and minbar protrude slightly out of the qibla wall. Also visible is an exposed stone staircase constructed along the qibla wall from the street side that reaches the roof. The minaret shaft has a rectangular shape that tapers upward to end in a pyramidal form. The four internal floors of the shaft were accessed by a now-collapsed spiral staircase entered from within the mosque. On each side of the minaret, and on each floor, a rectangular window with a stone lintel provides lighting for its interior.

Al Dar'i Quarter

Al Dar'i Quarter is located in the neighborhood of Omar Bin Al Khatab Mosque and Marid fortress, which represent the old quarter of Dumat Al Jandal. Al Dar'i Quarter is considered to be one of remaining antiquities of Dumat Al Jandal's ancient city which has escaped the demolition shovels befalling the historical market of Dumat Al Jandal 25 years ago. Dr. Khalil Al Meaigil has stated that, the facilities of the quarter which dates back to the middle Islamic age have established on antiquities layers and is based on layers of archaeological works dating back to the mid-first millennium BC. The neighborhood is characterized by the stone buildings and stone lanes between the gardens and water, which had a life of residents living near by the springs. In Al Dar'i Quarter there are many of houses which archaeologists hope will enjoy the necessary care and restoration. Worth mentioning that, the old quarter is built on the ruins of the earlier revivals which can be seen in multiple layers, as well as the emergence of the old road of the district under the existing buildings.

Archaeology 
On 9 June 2020, the discovery of a 35-meter long triangular megalithic monument dated back to VI millennium BC which presumably dedicated to ritual practices was published in the journal Antiquity. Archaeological researchers from France, Saudi Arabia and Italy, headed by Olivia Munoz believe that these findings illuminate a pastoralist nomadic lifestyle and a ritual used in prehistoric Arabia.

Climate
In Dumat Al-Jandal, there is a desert climate. Most rain falls in the winter. The Köppen-Geiger climate classification is BWh. About  of precipitation falls annually.

See also

Ancient Towns in Saudi Arabia
Cities of the ancient Near East
Expedition of Khalid ibn al-Walid (Dumatul Jandal)
Expedition of Khalid ibn al-Walid (2nd Dumatul Jandal)
List of cities and towns in Saudi Arabia

External links
Home

SCTH   - Saudi Commission for Tourism & National Heritage
 A travel through the province of Al Jouf, Splendid Arabia: A travel site with photos and routes

  Tschanz, David W. "Unsung Crossroads" Saudi Aramco World, 1998

References 

Archaeological sites in Saudi Arabia
Al-Jawf Province
Wadi Sirhan